For the Sheffield Wednesday striker see Akpo Sodje

Akpo fields Discovered in 2000, the Akpo field is located in ultra deepwater of Nigeria.

A gas and condensate field, Akpo is operated by Total, holding a 24% interest in the project. Other participants in the license include CNOOC with 45% interest, Petrobras with 16%, NNPC with 10% and Sapetro with 5%

Field Development Beginning in 2005, the Akpo field development project includes 44 wells—22 production wells, 20 water injection wells and two gas injection—of which 22 have already been drilled, tied-back to an FPSO.

The subsea infrastructure consists of 110 kilometers of a complex ...

Activities BJ Services Completes Major Subsea Ops Offshore Nigeria
Type: Subsea Equipment

The company performed a series of pre-commissioning services on the field's flowlines and umbilicals.

Sources
 http://challengestempsreel.nouvelobs.com/french_news/art_15946.html
 http://www.rigzone.com/news/article.asp?a_id=22216

Oil fields of Nigeria
Natural gas fields in Nigeria